Cold Feet, a British comedy drama television series about the romantic relationships of three couples, won over 20 awards during and after its five-series run from 1998 to 2003.

Nominations include nine British Academy Television Awards (one win), thirteen British Comedy Awards (six wins), and three National Television Awards (two wins). Four of the seven principal actors have received "Best TV Comedy Actor/Actress" nominations at the British Comedy Awards. Creator and principal writer Mike Bullen was presented with the Writer of the Year award at the 2003 British Comedy Awards and Series 3 co-writer David Nicholls received a BAFTA nomination in 2001.

BAFTA Awards

British Academy Television Awards

British Academy Television Craft Awards

British Comedy Awards

Broadcast Awards

National Television Awards

Royal Television Society awards

Programme Awards

Craft & Design Awards

Television and Radio Industries Club Awards

Other awards

References 

Lists of awards by television series